Chaqalvand Rud-e Sofla (also Romanized as Chaqalvand Rūd-e Soflá and Chaghalvand Rūd-e Soflá; also known as Chaqalvand-e Pā’īn, Chaqalvand-e Soflá, and Chaqalvand Rūd) is a village in Qaedrahmat Rural District, Zagheh District, Khorramabad County, Lorestan Province, Iran. At the 2006 census, its population was 169, in 34 families.

References 

Towns and villages in Khorramabad County